Neritidae, common name the nerites, is a taxonomic family of small to medium-sized saltwater and freshwater snails which have a gill and a distinctive operculum. 

The family Neritidae includes marine genera such as Nerita, marine and freshwater genera such as Neritina, and freshwater and brackish water genera such as Theodoxus.

The common name "nerite" as well as the family name Neritidae and the genus name Nerita, are derived from the name of Nerites, who was a sea god in Greek mythology.

Distribution
Neritidae live primarily in the southern hemisphere, but there are some exceptions, such as a genus Theodoxus which can be found in Europe and Northern Africa  or Bathynerita naticoidea.

Taxonomy 
This family consists of the five following subfamilies (according to the taxonomy of the Gastropoda by Bouchet & Rocroi, 2005):
 Neritinae Rafinesque, 1815 - synonyms: Neritellinae Gray, 1847; Proto neritidae Kittl, 1899
 † Neritariinae Wenz, 1938
 Neritininae Poey, 1852
 tribe Neritinini Poey, 1852 - synonyms: Catilinae Gray, 1868; Orthopomatini Gray, 1868; Stenopomatini Gray, 1868; Septariini Jousseaume, 1894
 tribe Theodoxini Bandel, 2001
 Smaragdiinae H. B. Baker, 1923
 † Velatinae Bandel, 2001

Genera

Genera, subgenera and species within the family Neritidae include:
 † Bajanerita Squires, 1993 
 † Calyptronerita Le Renard, 1980 
 † Cuisenerita Symonds & Pacaud, 2010 
 † Mesoneritina Yen, 1946 
 † Monsneritina Kowalke, 2002 
Subfamily Neritinae
Genus Bathynerita Clarke, 1989
Genus Mienerita Dekker, 2000
Genus Nerita Linnaeus, 1758 - type genus, synonyms: Turrita Wagner, 1897
Subgenus Adenerita
Subgenus Amphinerita
Subgenus Cymostyla
Subgenus Heminerita
Subgenus Ilynerita
Subgenus Linnerita
Subgenus Melanerita Martens, 1889
Species Nerita atramentosa Reeve, 1855
Species Nerita melanotragus Smith, E. A., 1884
Subgenus Nerita
Subgenus Ritena
Subgenus Theliostyla

Subfamily † Neritariinae
 † Neritaria Koken, 1892

Subfamily Neritininae
 Clithon 	Montfort, 1810
 Clypeolum 	Récluz, 1842
 Fluvinerita Pilsbry, 1932
 Fluvinerita tenebricosa
  † Manana Gabuniya, 1949
  † Mananopsis Gabuniya, 1949 
 Nereina de Cristofori & Jan, 1832
 Neripteron Lesson, 1831
 Neripteron vespertinum (Sowerby II, 1849)

 Neritina Rafinesque, 1815
Subgenus Dostia
 † Neritinopsis Gabuniya, 1953 
 Neritodryas Martens, 1869
 Neritona Martens, 1869
 † Neritoplica Oppenheim, 1892 
 Puperita Gray, 1857
 Septaria Férussac, 1807
 Theodoxus Montfort, 1810
 † Velatella Meek, 1873 
 Vitta 	Mörch, 1852
 Vittina H. B. Baker, 1923

Subfamily Smaragdiinae
Genus Gaillardotia Bourguignat, 1877
Genus Magadis 	Melvill & Standen, 1899
 Genus Smaragdella Baker, 1923
 Genus Smaragdia Issel, 1869
Genus Smaragoista

Subfamily † Velatinae
 † Velates Montfort, 1810

Synonyms
 † Agapilia Harzhauser & Kowalke, 2001 : synonym of Vitta Mörch, 1852
 Navicella Lamarck, 1816: synonym of Septaria Férussac, 1807 (junior synonym)
 † Ninniopsis Tomlin, 1930: synonym of † Theodoxus (Ninniopsis) Tomlin, 1930 represented as Theodoxus Montfort, 1810 (original rank)
 Orthopoma Gray, 1868: synonym of Septaria Férussac, 1807
 Orthopomatini Gray, 1868: synonym of Neritininae Poey, 1852
 Paranerita Bourne, 1908: synonym of Vittina H. B. Baker, 1923 (Invalid: junior homonym of Paranerita Hampson, 1901 [Lepidoptera])
 Pseudonerita H. B. Baker, 1923: synonym of Neripteron (Pseudonerita) H. B. Baker, 1923 represented as Neripteron Lesson, 1831
 Serenia Benson, 1856: synonym of Neritona Martens, 1869 (unavailable name: established in synonymy)
 Tanalia Gray, 1847: synonym of Neritona Martens, 1869
 Theodoxia Bourguignat, 1877: synonym of Theodoxus Montfort, 1810 (Invalid: unjustified emendation of Theodoxus)
 Theodoxis Montfort, 1810: synonym of Theodoxus Montfort, 1810 (alternative original spelling, not in use)

References

 Starobogatov, Y. I. (1970). Fauna Molliuskov i Zoogeograficheskoe Raionirovanie Kontinental'nykh Vodoemov Zemnogo Shara [The Molluscan Fauna and Zoogeographical Zoning of the Continental Water Bodies of the World]. Nauka. Leningrad. 372 p., 12 tables

External links 
 Gray, J. E. (1868). Notes on Catillus, Humphrey, or Navicella, Lamarck, with descriptions of two new genera. Proceedings of the Zoological Society of London. 1867: 993-1000
 Bouchet, P. & Rocroi, J.-P. (2005). Classification and nomenclator of gastropod families. Malacologia. 47 (1-2): 1-397
 Bourne G. C. (1908). "Contributions to the morphology of the group Neritacea of aspidobranch gastropods. I. The Neritidae." Proceedings of the Zoological Society of London 1908: 810-887.
 Miocene Gastropods and Biostratigraphy of the Kern River Area, California; United States Geological Survey Professional Paper 642 

 
Taxa named by Constantine Samuel Rafinesque